Life Is Not a Fairy Tale is a book describing the life of American Idol (season 3) winner Fantasia Barrino, and her rise to national prominence. The book later became a television movie shown on Lifetime.

Book

Life Is Not a Fairy Tale by Fantasia

In her autobiography Life Is Not a Fairy Tale, a New York Times bestseller, Fantasia tells of her rise from high-school dropout to music star.

As an American Idol contestant, she captured the hearts of millions with her extraordinary voice and sassy style, with those qualities she won the talent contest and became a nationally prominent singer. But her life began much more humbly. At the age of seventeen, despite her remarkable talent, Fantasia was an uneducated, unmarried teenage mother living in poverty. She was faced with many tough battles growing up in the city of High Point, North Carolina, which is mainly famous for its furniture Market. She shows respect and admiration to the strong women who raised her, her mother and grandmother, both preachers who instilled in her a strong faith in God. Both women struggled with the same issues as Fantasia at a young age which made Fantasia realize that she would only be headed down the same dead end path if she didn't make a change for the better.

Film

Life Is Not A Fairy Tale: The Fantasia Barrino Story is a 2006 American biographical film directed by Debbie Allen, loosely based on the life of American singer Fantasia Barrino. The film was adapted from the book Life Is Not A Fairy Tale written by Fantasia.

Overview
In this Lifetime original movie, director Debbie Allen gives viewers a first hand look at the struggles Fantasia faced before/during her rise to fame. The movie begins with Fantasia's humble beginnings, growing up in a close knit God-fearing family that faced its own personal demons of struggling with their dreams. Fantasia faces problems with her self-esteem, sexual abuse, teen pregnancy and her faith as she fights to overcome her mistakes at a young age. This movie depicted from her best-selling biopic of the same name, provides an emotional example of what you can achieve when believing in yourself.

The movie premiered on Saturday, August 19, 2006 at 9:00 PM EST. It was Lifetime's second most watched movie in its 22-year history, with more than nineteen million viewers tuning in during the August 19–20 weekend. The movie was ranked the number one basic cable movie premiere in 2006 among women ages 18–49. Weekend online traffic to Lifetimetv.com rose by more than seventy percent during that weekend. 

In 2007, the movie and its actors including Fantasia, Loretta Devine and Kadeem Hardison were nominated for 4 NAACP Image Awards. Kadeem Hardison won his award. It was also nominated for a 2007 Teen Choice Award for Choice TV: Movie.

Cast
 Fantasia Barrino as herself
 Jamia Simone Nash as young Fantasia
 Viola Davis as Diane Barrino
 Kadeem Hardison as Joseph Barrino
 Loretta Devine as Addie Collins
 Thomas Tah Hyde III as Rico Barrino
 Paul Amadi as young Rico
 Terrance Thomas as Teeny
 Deanna Dawn as Ruby
 Chico Benymon as Rodney Birks
 Norman Nixon Jr. as Dwayne

Soundtrack
Although a soundtrack was never released for the film, many songs were performed throughout the film. The following track listing are the songs that are performed in order throughout the film.

Track listing
"Chain of Fools" — Fantasia
"Respect Yourself" — Viola Davis
"Wade in the Water" — Viola Davis
"The Lord is Blessing Me" — Viola Davis & Jamia Simone Nash
"ABC" — Jamia Simone Nash, Paul Amadi, & Terrance Thomas
"Almighty God" — Viola Davis
"Pass Me Not" — Fantasia, Viola Davis, and Loretta Davis
"Signed, Sealed, Delivered I'm Yours — Fantasia
"Proud Mary — Fantasia
"I Heard It Through the Grapevine" — Fantasia
"Almighty God" — Viola Davis & Loretta Davis
"Summertime — Fantasia
"God Bless the Child" — Fantasia
"I Wanna Hear You Say (Do You Love Me)" — Fantasia

External links
Lifetime TV LINAFT Movie Page
Official LINAFT page

Notes
Excerpt: Life is Not a Fairy Tale, by Fantasia

African-American autobiographies
Films based on biographies
2006 television films
2006 films
Films directed by Debbie Allen
Fantasia Barrino
Literature by African-American women
2000s English-language films